Non (also Nonna or Nonnita) was, according to Christian tradition, the mother of Saint David, the patron saint of Wales.

Legend
The Life of St David was written around 1095 by Rhigyfarch, and is our main source of knowledge for the lives of both St David (died c. 589) and his mother. Rhigyfarch was a Norman cleric whose father had been Bishop of St David's for 10 years. He states that she was a nun at Ty Gwyn ("the white house") near Whitesands Bay (Pembrokeshire), (although she may have become a nun later as a widow).

Tradition holds that Nonita was raped and that the product of that rape was David – she was "unhappily seized and exposed to the sacrilegious violence of one of the princes of the country". Rhigyfarch recounts the tradition that the rapist was Sanctus, King of Ceredigion, who came upon Non while travelling through Dyfed (in South Wales). After conceiving, Nonita, who remained celibate both before and afterwards, lived on bread and water alone. When a preacher found himself unable to preach in the presence of her unborn child, this was taken as a sign that the child would himself be a great preacher. A local ruler (possibly Aergol Lawhir) learned of this pregnancy and feared the power of the child to be born. He plotted to kill him upon birth, but on the day of her labour a great storm made it impossible for anyone to travel outdoors. Only the place where Nonita groaned with birth-pangs was bathed in light. The pain was said to have been so intense that her fingers left marks as she grasped a rock and the stone itself split asunder in sympathy with her. A church was built in the place of David's birth and this stone is now concealed in the foundations of the altar.

Variations on her story state that:
 Non may have been the daughter of the nobleman Cynyr of Caer Goch (in Pembrokeshire).
 The chieftain who fathered David may have been named Xantus, Sandde or Sant. (Rees points out that names meaning 'Holy' and 'Nun' might be seen as fitting for the parents of a great saint.)
 Non may have been married to Sant before David's birth or after the birth of the saint.
 She brought the boy up at Henfeynyw near Aberaeron and founded a convent nearby at what is now called Llanon (the village being named after her).
 Subsequently, Non may have travelled to Cornwall and ultimately ended her days in a Breton convent.
 In some sources, Non is commemorated as a male companion of David.

Veneration
The place where Non gave birth to Saint David is now named Capel Non, and is marked by the Chapel of St Non. Close to the ruins of this chapel is her holy well; nearby also stand a modern retreat house, and a chapel dedicated to Our Lady and Saint Non built in 1934. The ruins are easily accessible from the Pembrokeshire Coastal Path. Other churches bear her name in Devon, Ceredigion and Carmarthenshire.

Non's relics were initially venerated at Altarnun in Cornwall. However, these were destroyed during the Reformation. Medieval glass fragments which remain above the altar may depict Non; there is a holy well nearby with a long tradition of bringing the insane to be immersed (one legend has them being thrown in backwards) in hope of a cure. She is also the patron of Pelynt in Cornwall where there is St Nonna's Holy Well.

Non died at Dirinon, Brittany, ten miles east of Brest, and is buried there; her shrine can still be seen in Dirinon's parish church. An alterenative legend puts here being martyred at the hands of druids at Bradstone in Devon where the church is dedicated to her.

St Non's feast day is given as 2 March by Mullins and by the 18th century text of Browne Willis cited by Rees. Nash Ford identifies 3 March as her date of death. 3 March is also the date recognised by Simpson. She is listed under 5 March in the 1995 revision of the Church in Wales calendar. At the Parish of Pelynt, which contains St Nonna's Holy Well, the feast of St Nonna is celebrated on the second Sunday after Midsummer's Day.

St Non is not officially commemorated in the current liturgy of the Roman Catholic Church: she does not appear in the 2004 edition of the Roman Martyrology, nor the Roman Catholic calendar for Wales.

See also
 Chapel of St Non
 St Non church of Llanerch Aeron parish, near Aberaeron
 St Nonna's Church, Altarnun
 St Nonna's Church, Bradstone, Devon
 :fr:Église Sainte-Nonne de Dirinon

References

External links
 Saint Non in A Dictionary of Saintly Women (1905), which contains a fair-sized hagiography for her.
 Saint Non's Retreat Centre - History Page
 Sermon for the Feast of St Non given by Canon Chancellor Dr Patrick Thomas at St David's Cathedral on 4 March 2012.
 Parish of Altarnun
 St Nun's Well, Pelynt - a video tour
 St Non's Well at British Listed Buildings
 St Nonna's Well - crowdsourced data and images
 Heritage Page at Dirinon (French)
 Pictures of the Church at Dirinon
 Images from Dirinon

5th-century births
6th-century deaths
People from Pembrokeshire
Children of Cunedda
6th-century Christian saints
Female saints of medieval Wales
Medieval Breton saints
6th-century Welsh people